Paradax Records is a dance music record label based in Los Angeles, California. Paradax's motto is “Nothing Over 126bpm” This bpm (Beats Per Minute) designator signifies that most tracks produced on the label do not exceed 126 bpm thus branding the label as a true deep house label. It is Paradax’s belief that a Deep House track is usually within the range of 119-126 bpm’s.

DJ Dax & Dwayne Taylor started the label in 1999. In 2003 they launched their official production name “Soulato” pronounced so-la-toe, which is “just a cool way of combining the words Soul and Latin.”

While both DJ Dax & Dwayne started out as DJ’s, their respective paths took a slightly different direction. DJ Dax still continues to spin music and produce, but has added acting to his resume. Dwayne’s primary focus is on A&R  (Artist & Repertoire) and artist management. Still, they both oversee the entire production of each release. They currently have fourteen vinyl and eight CD releases.

Having established an unparalleled presence as DJ’s, remixers and producers, Soulato continue to use their combined talent to bring the dance community “a good solid blend of beats, instruments and most importantly, artists”.

Artists 
Aaron Arce
Anita Sherman
Art Guiterrez
Bernard Harris
Brady Stone
Chellena Black
David Montoya & Juan Flores Jr. aka Estranjeros
Dax (Daniel) Delgado
DJ Rico
Dusean
Eddie Amador
Evelyn Harris
Frankie Ho
Frankie Medina
Gabriel Horizon
Jerry Flores
Jesse "Outlaw" Hinjosa
Jessica Williams
Jose Jimenez aka J-Vibe
Joseph Junior
Ken Myles
Lars Behrenroth
MAQman
Marietta Archille
Marta Santamaria
Martin Villaneuve
Miguel Plasencia
Moses Eleyjian Sevan Shahgaldian aka roqsta
Paul Zazadze
Pino Arduini
Rene Amaro
Rob "House Music"
Ryan "The rula" 
Teddy "Q" Zamora
Tony Largo
Victor Flores
Victor Simonelli
Wayne Howard
Willy Sanjuan
Womina Wells

Vinyl-Releases

CD Releases 
PR14 - I Don’t Need You No More (2006)
PR15 - WMC 07 Paradax Sampler (2007)
PR16 - Paradax Summer Sampler (2007)
PR17 - Mingle With The Night (2008)
PR18 - Sweet Freedom “The 2009 Remixes” (2009)
PR19 - Love Don’t Hit (2009)
PR20 - CHAINS (2010)
PR21 - Funky Pressure feat Eszti (2014)
PR22 - Housemusic Story feat. Dusean (2014)
PR23 - Come on stand up-feat Claudja Barry (2016)

References

External links
 Official site

American record labels
Record labels established in 1999
Electronic dance music record labels
House music record labels
Companies based in Los Angeles
1999 establishments in California